Smodicum confusum is a species of beetle in the family Cerambycidae. It was described by Martins in 1985.

References

Cerambycinae
Beetles described in 1985